The 1995–96 Divizia B was the 56th season of the second tier of the Romanian football league system.

The format has been maintained to two series, each of them having 18 teams. At the end of the season, the winners of the series promoted to Divizia A and the last two places from both series relegated to Divizia C.

Team changes

To Divizia B
Promoted from Divizia C
 Foresta Fălticeni
 Oțelul Târgoviște
 Minerul Motru
 Minaur Zlatna
 FC Onești
 Dunărea Călărași
 ARO Câmpulung
 Olimpia Satu Mare

Relegated from Divizia A
 Electroputere Craiova
 Maramureș Baia Mare
 UTA Arad

From Divizia B
Relegated to Divizia C
 Flacăra Moreni
 ICIM Brașov
 Faur București
 CFR Cluj
 Acord Focșani
 Phoenix Baia Mare
 Callatis Mangalia
 Armătura Zalău

Promoted to Divizia A
 Selena Bacău
 Politehnica Timișoara
 Politehnica Iași

Renamed teams
Constant Galați was renamed as Dunărea Galați.

Jiul IELIF Craiova was moved from Craiova to Caracal and renamed as FC Caracal.

League tables

Serie I

Serie II

Top scorers 
16 goals
  Giani Gorga (Steaua Mizil)

15 goals
  Adrian Bogoi (Oțelul Târgoviște)

12 goals
  Mihai Guriță (Bucovina Suceava)
  Cristian Pușcaș (CSM Reșița)

11 goals
  Mircea Stanciu (ASA Târgu Mureș)
  Doru Balmuș (Dunărea Galați)

9 goals
  Lucian Marinescu (CSM Reșița)
  Gheorghe Biță (Electroputere Craiova)

8 goals
  Costel Lazăr (Poiana Câmpina)
  Vasile Bârdeș (Oțelul Târgoviște)

7 goals
  Dan Găldean (Minaur Zlatna)

See also
1995–96 Divizia A

References

Liga II seasons
Rom
2